Fédération Internationale de Tir aux Armes Sportives de Chasse (FITASC, "International Shooting Federation of Hunting Sport Weapons") is an international sport federation for sport shooting, specifically clay pigeon shooting similar to sporting clays, trap and skeet.

Rules
It involves strategically placed clay target throwers (called traps) set to simulate live game birds/animals- teal, rabbits, pheasant etc. Shooters on each layout or "parcour", shoot in turn at various combinations of single and double clay birds. Each station or "peg" on a parcour will have a menu card that lets the shooter know the sequence of clay birds he or she will be shooting at (i.e. which trap the clay bird will be coming from). The shooters will be presented with 4 or 5 two-shot singles which they will rotate through and then two pair. In Old Style FITASC there are three pegs on each parcour, with 25 shots to a parcour.

Typical targets are a rabbit, chandelle, overhead, trap (outgoing), crossing, teal (launched straight up into the air), and an incoming bird.  The targets are shot as singles and as doubles (Double targets can be simultaneous, on report or trailing/following-"rafael" in FITASC terminology). All single targets may be attempted with two shots and are counted as killed with either shot, two shots may also be used to attempt doubles and either target or both may be shot with only those two shots.  In other words, a shooter may attempt the first target in a double and upon missing, may continue to shoot that same target for score if broken even though the second target will be lost due to being missed in the double.

Disciplines
There are six disciplines under the FITASC rule.
Combined game Shooting
Compak Sporting
Helice
Sporting
Trap
Universal trench

Competitions
In 2019, with the edition held from 31 May to 2 June in Maribor in Slovenia, the European Championships of Universal Trench, organized by FITASC, reached the 47th edition.

FITASC organized also World and European Championships of helice shooting.

See also 
 List of shooting sports organizations

References

External links
 
 PALMARES FOSSE UNIVERSELLE CHAMPIONNAT D'EUROPE

Shotgun shooting sports
Shooting sports organizations